Marsjö is a small village on the Swedish island of Öland. It is in Borgholm Municipality.

Populated places in Borgholm Municipality